The 2000 Swedish Golf Tour, known as the Telia Tour for sponsorship reasons, was the 15th season of the Swedish Golf Tour, a series of professional golf tournaments for women held in Sweden and Finland.

Susanne Westling narrowly won the Order of Merit ahead of Lisa Hed despite Hed winning four tournaments, including the opening and closing events of the season.

Schedule
The season consisted of eleven tournaments played between May and September, where one event was held in Finland.

Order of Merit

Source:

See also
2000 Swedish Golf Tour (men's tour)

References

External links
Official homepage of the Swedish Golf Tour

Swedish Golf Tour (women)
Swedish Golf Tour (women)